Australia competed at the 1974 British Commonwealth Games in Christchurch New Zealand from 24 January to 2 February 1974. It was Australia's tenth appearance at the Commonwealth Games, having competed at every Games since their inception in 1930.

Australia won medals in eight of the ten sports that it entered.

Medallists
The following Australian competitors won medals at the games.

|  style="text-align:left; width:78%; vertical-align:top;"|

| width="22%" align="left" valign="top" |

Officials
General Manager - Bill Young 
Assistant Manager & Advance Party - Les Martyn 
Assistant Managers Women - Gwen Chester, Dorothy Nordahl 
Asministraive Officer & Advanmce Party - Ivan Lund 
Transport Officer - Arthur Tunstall  
Team Secretary - Peggy Tunstall 
Medical Officer - Dr Anthony 'Tony' Miller ; Physiotherapist - Thomas Dobson ; Masseurs - Percy Barnes, George Saunders 
Section Officials - Athletics Manager - Ray Durie, Athletics Assistant Manager - Clive Lee, Athletics Coaches - Alan Barlow, John Daly, Henri Schubert ; Badminton Manager - Don Stockins, Badminton Coach - Ian Hutchinson ; Boxing Manager - Leslie Harold, Boxing Coach - Denis Dack ; Cycling Manager - Leslie Dunn, Cycling Coaches - Keith Reynolds, Max Leslie ; Shooting Manager - Tibor Gonzol, Shooting Training Co-ordinator - Dr Robery Godfrey ; Swimming Manager - Joe King, Swimming Coaches - Ursula Carlile, David Urry ; Diving Coach - Bruce Prance ; Weightlifting Manager - Max Ryan, Weightlifting Coach - Robert Taylor ' Wrestling Manager - William Howden, Wrestling Coach - Choudhry Ashraf

See also
 Australia at the 1972 Summer Olympics
 Australia at the 1976 Summer Olympics

References

External links 
Commonwealth Games Australia Results Database

1974
British Commonwealth Games
Nations at the 1974 British Commonwealth Games